Vechter Jansz. van Teffelen (1563–1619), was a Dutch Golden Age malt maker and mayor of Haarlem.

He was the son of Jan Thaemsz. and Aleyd Vechters. He married Anneke Claesdr. of Assendelft in 1601. He became a judge, magistrate and mayor of Haarlem. He was lieutenant of the St. George militia from 1606-1609, and captain 1612-1615. He was portrayed by Frans Hals in The Banquet of the Officers of the St George Militia Company in 1616.

He died in Haarlem.

References

Vechter Jansz. van Teffelen in De Haarlemse Schuttersstukken, by Jhr. Mr. C.C. van Valkenburg, pp. 66, Haerlem : jaarboek 1958, on the website of the North Holland Archives

1563 births
1619 deaths
Frans Hals
Businesspeople from Haarlem
Mayors of Haarlem
Dutch brewers